Bipunctiphorus dissipata is a moth of the family Pterophoridae. It is found in the Honshu and Kyushu islands of Japan.

The length of the forewings is 7–10 mm.

External links
Taxonomic And Biological Studies Of Pterophoridae Of Japan (Lepidoptera)
Japanese Moths

Platyptiliini
Moths of Japan
Moths described in 1963